Steve Godfrey, Steven Godfrey, or Stephen Godfrey is the name of:
 Steve Godfrey (medium), host of U.S. radio show The Other Side
 Stephen Godfrey (1953–1993), senior feature writer for Canadian newspaper The Globe and Mail
 Steve Godfrey, member of English rock band Switches
 "Sir" Stephen Godfrey, ex-member of U.S. country band Vince Vance & The Valiants
 Steven Godfrey, manager of public relations for TNA (Total Nonstop Action Wrestling)